Huntingburg Town Hall and Fire Engine House, also known as Old City Hall, is a historic town hall and fire station located at Huntingburg, Dubois County, Indiana.  It was built in 1885–1886, and is a two-story, Victorian style brick building with a gable roof. It features a reconstructed cupola. It was built to serve multiple purposes and housed an opera house on the second floor.  The building housed city offices until it was closed in 1971.

It was added to the National Register of Historic Places in 1975.  It is located in the Huntingburg Commercial Historic District.

References

City and town halls on the National Register of Historic Places in Indiana
Neoclassical architecture in Indiana
Government buildings completed in 1886
Huntingburg, Indiana
National Register of Historic Places in Dubois County, Indiana
Historic district contributing properties in Indiana
Fire stations on the National Register of Historic Places in Indiana
Victorian architecture in Indiana